Millers Hill is a mountain in Barnstable County, Massachusetts. It is located northeast of Provincetown in the Town of Provincetown. Oak Head is located northwest of Millers Hill.

References

Mountains of Massachusetts
Mountains of Barnstable County, Massachusetts